Victor Conte Jr. (born 1950 in Fresno, California) is a former bassist with Tower of Power and the founder and president of Bay Area Laboratory Co-operative (BALCO), a sports nutrition center in California. He served time in prison in 2005 after pleading guilty to conspiracy to distribute steroids and money laundering. He currently operates Scientific Nutrition for Advanced Conditioning (SNAC Nutrition).

Early life and music 
Victor Conte Jr. was born in 1950 in Fresno, California to Shirley and Victor Conte Sr. He was the oldest of three children in a working-class Italian family. After graduating from McLane High School he attended Fresno City College but dropped out of college in 1969 after being convinced by his cousin, musician Bruce Conte, to join the band Common Ground as bass player. In 1970 he quit playing in Common Ground and joined the band Pure Food and Drug Act. At the time Conte's nickname was "Walking Fish", due to his unusual way of moving across the stage when he was performing. He left Pure Food and Drug Act some time prior to 1977.

Victor Conte was a member of Tower of Power from 1977 until 1979 playing bass guitar. He also collaborated during that period with pianist Herbie Hancock and violinist Sugarcane Harris.

Bay Area Laboratory Co-operative 

He founded in 1984 the Bay Area Laboratory Co-operative (BALCO), a sports nutrition center first located in Millbrae, California and later relocated to Burlingame, California. The United States Anti-Doping Agency (USADA) says he developed the banned steroid tetrahydrogestrinone (THG) with the help of bodybuilding chemist Patrick Arnold. Pursuant to a plea bargain struck with prosecutors, he entered guilty pleas in July 2005 to one count of conspiracy to distribute steroids and a second count of laundering a portion of a check. He was sentenced in October to spend four months in the federal Taft Correctional Institution in Taft, California, and another four on house arrest.

In December 2004, he participated in an interview with Martin Bashir on ABC's 20/20 program, where he admitted to running doping programs, which have broken Olympic records, as well as revealing that: "The whole history of the games is just full of corruption, cover-up, performance-enhancing drug use."

In the interview he implicated, among others, five-time Olympic gold medalist Marion Jones and her partner Tim Montgomery, Kelli White (who later admitted using performance-enhancing drugs), British athlete Dwain Chambers, and NFL player Bill Romanowski.

On December 21, 2006, Yahoo Sports reported that one of Conte's initial defense lawyers, Troy Ellerman, had been targeted by the FBI as a possible source of leaks to the media during the Barry Bonds probe. On February 14, 2007, Ellerman pleaded guilty to leaking grand jury testimony. It was also reported that FBI agents were an additional source of leaks.

In May 2007, Conte claimed to again be providing supplements for Dwain Chambers, who left athletics to play in the NFL Europa league for the Hamburg Sea Devils before returning to athletics in 2008. According to Conte, these nutritional supplements, provided via his company Scientific Nutrition for Advanced Conditioning, are perfectly legal.

On December 13, 2007 Conte appeared on CNN before The Mitchell Report was officially released.

Books 
Game of Shadows: Barry Bonds, BALCO, and the Steroids Scandal that Rocked Professional Sports was published in 2006 by two San Francisco Chronicle investigative reporters, relating to the case. There were controversies about the informant and/or source of the information for these books and related court cases.

In 2008, in the aftermath of the investigation, Conte produced a book BALCO: The Straight Dope on Barry Bonds, Marion and What We Can Do to Save Sports which was co-written with author Nathan Jendrick. There had been a legal battle of defamation litigation regarding the book's publication by boxer Shane Mosley and it delayed the publication date. Mosley dropped the lawsuit, but not before Skyhorse publishing had been scared away from publishing. The book is officially unpublished as of 2017, but the unpublished manuscript has been made available.

Scientific Nutrition for Advanced Conditioning 
In 2011, Conte started a new company, Scientific Nutrition for Advanced Conditioning (SNAC Nutrition) based in San Carlos, California, which in addition to nutritional supplements also offers boxing and sports training. SNAC Nutrition is working with boxer Zab Judah, and Conte has previously worked with Andre Berto, Nonito Donaire, and Andre Ward.

References

External links
 Timeline of Scandal by patch
 ABC 20/20 interview with Victor Conte
 2003 biography by BBC Sport
 Guardian (UK) report on interview
 Scientific Nutrition for Advanced Conditioning
 

Living people
1950 births
Sports controversies
American jazz bass guitarists
American male bass guitarists
Tower of Power members
American people of Italian descent
American male jazz musicians
American money launderers
American people convicted of drug offenses